Galium aschenbornii is a species of flowering plant in the genus Galium, native to Mexico, Central America, Colombia and Ecuador.

Description
Its flowers are typically red or pink (occasionally white, yellow or greenish) and actinomorphic with elongated corolla lobes, although few flowers are normally produced.

Distribution
Galium aschenbornii is found in mountainous regions of Mexico, as far north as Jalisco and San Luis Potosí, and south through Central America to Ecuador.

References

External links
Protologue of Galium aschenbornii in Schauer's original description

aschenbornii
Flora of Central America
Flora of Mexico
Flora of Colombia
Flora of Ecuador
Plants described in 1847